Amazing Things is the eighth studio album by the Scottish Celtic rock band Runrig, released in 1993.

The cover features a close-up photo of the Hugh MacDiarmid Memorial, near Langholm, created by sculptor Jake Harvey.

Critical reception

The Waterloo Region Record wrote that "Runrig is relentlessly serious, their music always skirting the edges of overkill." The Times opined that the band sounds "like a rockier version of Chris De Burgh on 'Dream Fields' and 'Move a Mountain'."

AllMusic noted that "the folk genre that dominated their early independent albums had virtually disappeared and had been replaced by an anthemic rock sound heavily influenced by their fellow Scots countrymen Big Country and Irish band U2."

Track listing
 "Amazing Things" – 4:18
 "Wonderful" – 4:11
 "The Greatest Flame" – 5:04
 "Move a Mountain" – 5:13
 "Pòg Aon Oidhche Earraich" (A Kiss One Spring Evening) – 3:38
 "Dream Fields" – 5:54
 "Song of the Earth" – 4:52
 "Forever Eyes of Blue" – 4:09
 "Sràidean na Roinn-Eòrpa" (Streets of Europe) – 5:24
 "Canada" – 5:12
 "Àrd" (High) – 6:00
 "On the Edge" – 3:53

Personnel
Iain Bayne – drums, percussion
Malcolm Jones – guitars, banjo, mandolin, accordion, pipes, bass guitar, backing vocals
Calum Macdonald – percussion, spoken vocals
Rory Macdonald – vocals, bass guitar, accordion
Donnie Munro – lead vocals
Peter Wishart – keyboards

Charts

References

1993 albums
Runrig albums
Scottish Gaelic music